King of Asgard is a Swedish melodic death metal band from Östergötland. The band has released one demo and four full-length albums, most recently svartrviðr in 2021, and is currently signed to Trollmusic.

History

Formation, Prince of Maerings demo, and Fi'mbulvintr
King of Asgard was formed in 2008 by Karl Beckman and Karsten Larsson, former members of Viking metal act Mithotyn. Following the release of their 2009 demo, Prince of Maerings, King of Asgard signed with Metal Blade Records. The band's debut album, Fi'mbulvintr, was released in 2010.

... to North
The band's second record, ... to North, was released by Metal Blade Records in 2012. In early 2012, bassist Jonas Albrektsson was quoted on Blabbermouth as saying, "... to North takes off pretty much where Fi'mbulvintr left off, so to say, with a natural development, more varied songs and structures. It's a development of our sound which will be recognized by old fans." Albrektsson went on to say, "this time around I've been more involved in the writing process along with Karl, which kind of shines through, giving the songs a wider perspective." A video was released for the album's lead single, "The Nine Worlds Burn".

Digipak versions of the album feature a bonus cover of Isengard's "Winterskugge".

Karg
Karg followed in 2014. It would be King of Asgard's final release through their longtime label, Metal Blade Records.

Kargs release was preceded on 19 May 2014 by the debut of its first single, "The Runes of Hel", which featured an accompanying video.

Metal Injection noted a shift in the band's musical direction from the style of King of Asgard's previous outings, stating that Karg "continues to elaborate on their traditional Viking metal, but looming within it is an ominous forecast of the black metal variety".

The album features a cover of Bathory's "Total Destruction".

Signing with Trollmusic, taudr
In 2016, King of Asgard announced they had left Metal Blade Records to join Swedish label Trollmusic. According to the label, the band's fourth release, taudr, was recorded in June, and was expected to see release in October 2016.

On 16 August 2016, King of Asgard announced that the mastering of taudr had been completed at Kalthallen Studios. The album was recorded and mixed by Magnus Andersson at Sweden's Endarker Studios. It was released on 17 March 2017.

svartrviðr
King of Asgard's second album with Trollmusic, svartrviðr, was released in 2021. It continued their development towards longer songs and towards black metal.

Personnel

Current members
 Karl Beckman (2008–present) (guitar/vocals)
 Jonas Albrektsson (2009–present) (bass)
 Ted Sjulmark (2015–present) (guitar)
 Matthias Westman (2015–present) (drums)

Former members
 Karsten Larsson (2008–2015) (drums)
 Lars Tängmark (2010–2015) (guitars)

Discography

Studio albums
 Fi'mbulvintr (Metal Blade Records, 2010)
 ... to North (Metal Blade Records, 2012)
 Karg (Metal Blade Records, 2014)
 taudr (Trollmusic, 2017)
 svartrviðr (Trollmusic, 2021)

Demos
 Prince of Maerings (self-released, 2009)

Notes

External links
 Facebook
 Trollmusic Records Website

Swedish melodic death metal musical groups
Musical groups established in 2008
Swedish viking metal musical groups
Metal Blade Records artists